Horacio Casco (13 September 1868 – 6 December 1931) was an Argentine fencer. He competed in the foil and sabre competitions at the 1924 Summer Olympics.

References

External links
 

1868 births
1931 deaths
Argentine male fencers
Argentine foil fencers
Argentine sabre fencers
Olympic fencers of Argentina
Fencers at the 1924 Summer Olympics